Early presidential elections were held in the Comoros on 24 March 2019 alongside regional elections. A second round would have been held on 21 April if required, but incumbent President Azali Assoumani was re-elected in the first round of voting.

Electoral system
Until 2018, the presidency of the Comoros rotated between the country's three main islands; Anjouan, Grande Comore and Mohéli. The 2010 elections were limited to Mohélian candidates and the 2016 elections saw candidates from Grand Comore contest the elections. The next presidential election would have seen a president elected from Anjouan.

However, a constitutional referendum in July 2018 saw voters approve constitutional amendments that scrapped the rotation system and instituted a standard two-round system in which a candidate has to receive a majority of the vote in the first round to be elected, with a second round held if no candidate is able to win in the first round. The changes also moved the next presidential elections forward to 2019 and allowed incumbent President Azali Assoumani run for a second term.

The referendum led to violent protests and an armed uprising in Anjouan in October 2018, which was stopped by the military after several days.

Candidates
A total of 20 candidates registered to contest the elections, with the Supreme Court determining the final list of eligible participants. Incumbent President Assoumani ran for reelection, whilst other candidates attempting to register included the two losing candidates from the nationwide vote in 2016 (Mohamed Ali Soilihi and Mouigni Baraka) and Salim Saadi, who contested the 2016 primary elections as an independent. Seven of the 20 applicants were rejected, including the main opposition candidate Ibrahim Mohamed Soulé.

Results

Aftermath
Following the election, the fourth-placed candidate Mohamed Soilihi called for the results to be invalidated and for a campaign of civil disobedience. He was subsequently arrested.

References

Comoros
2019 in the Comoros
March 2019 events in Africa
Presidential elections in the Comoros